The men's javelin throw event at the 2002 Commonwealth Games was held on 31 July.

Results

References
Official results
Results at BBC

Javelin
2002